William Reece Smith Jr. (September 19, 1925 – January 11, 2013) was an American lawyer.  Smith served as the interim president of the University of South Florida, and the president of the American Bar Association. He was born in 1925 in Athens, Tennessee.

Smith was a native of eastern Tennessee, but attended public schools in Plant City, Florida while growing up.  He received an athletic scholarship to attend the University of South Carolina, where he was a quarterback for the South Carolina Gamecocks football team and participated in the Reserve Officers Training Corps (ROTC).  Smith earned a bachelor's degree in naval science from South Carolina in 1946, and after graduation he was commissioned as an officer in the U.S. Navy.  After his years in the service, he attended the University of Florida College of Law.  He received his law degree in 1949, and he was also a member of the student bar, Florida Blue Key and the Florida Law Review.  After law school, Smith was selected as a Rhodes Scholar and he did graduate studies in international law at Christ Church, Oxford.

Smith later joined the faculty of the University of Florida College of Law, and he would then go on to private practice in Tampa, Florida.  In 1976–1977, the Florida Board of Control appointed him to serve as interim president of the University of South Florida in Tampa, and, in 1980, he was elected the president of the American Bar Association.

He died in Tampa in January 2013.

See also 
List of Levin College of Law graduates
List of Rhodes Scholars
List of University of South Carolina people

Notes

References 
Greenberg, Mark I.,  University of South Florida: The First Fifty Years, 1956-2006, University of South Florida, Tampa, Florida (2006).

External links 
 Smith as a leader for the ABA
 W. Reece Smith's Official Bio
 Info about Smith on a UVA site

Alumni of Christ Church, Oxford
American Rhodes Scholars
Presidents of the American Bar Association
Presidents of the University of South Florida
United States Navy officers
Fredric G. Levin College of Law alumni
South Carolina Gamecocks football players
1925 births
2013 deaths
People from Athens, Tennessee
People from Tampa, Florida
20th-century American lawyers